Indian medicine may refer to:
Ayurveda
Healthcare in India
Medical tourism in India
Pharmaceutical industry in India
Siddha medicine
Unani medicine
Native American ethnobotany
Medical ethnobotany of India

See also
Traditional Tibetan medicine, also practiced in India